A number of steamships were named Jalabala, including:

, an Indian cargo ship torpedoed and sunk in 1943
, an Indian coaster in service 1954–64

Ship names